The A8 Highway is a paved primary trunk road in Zimbabwe running from Bulawayo to Victoria Falls. It is managed by the Zimbabwe National Roads Administration (ZINARA). It is part of the R9 Route, which links Victoria  Falls with Beitbridge.

Background

The A8 Highway is part of Zimbabwe's regional road corridor number R9 which runs from the border with Zambia to the border with South Africa. It is also part of Trans-African Highway Network no. 4 (Cairo-Cape Town Highway), which is a route designated to connect Cairo and Cape Town.

From Zambia the A8 Highway can be picked at Victoria Falls border post connecting from the T1 Highway from Lusaka. In Bulawayo the highway starts as "Masotsha Ndlovu Avenue" heading west, then at a round-about turns right into "Lady Stanley" which ends at the railway line, and there A8 proper begins.

Quick Road Data Table in reference to Regional Trunk Roads Network (RTRN).

Operations
A8 is part of the Trans-African Highway 4 which is runs from Cairo through Gaborone to Cape Town. The TAH 4 is 8.861 Kilometers long and the A8 covers only 440 km which is only about 5% of the trans-national road corridor. However together with the A7 Highway that runs 110 km from Bulawayo to Plumtree Border Post the Zimbabwean length of the TAH 4 becomes 550 km, which is about 6% of the total trans-national corridor.

Junctions

As shown on the Automobile Association 1973 Map.

Lupane Road
From Bulawayo the first major junction is at Lupane Turn-off 176 km away.
( ) This right turn is the P10 Road to Lupane Centre. This is the shortest trunk road in the system, only about 5 km long.
The P10 Road after Lupane it connects with the P9 Highway.

(  )
The P9 Highway runs from here to Nkayi where it continues as P8 Highway to Kwekwe via Silobela. This is the shortest route from Victoria Falls to Harare.

Halfway House
About 51 km from Lupane Turn-off is Halfway House, 230 km from Bulawayo and 210 km before Victoria Falls.

Lubimbi Turn-off

24 km from Halfway House is Lubimbi Turn Off to the right. This road eventually reaches Magunje and the A1 Highway to Chirundu. A 4x4 truck is recommended for this route.

Dete-Kamativi Crossroads

About 59 km from Halfway House is the Dete-Kamativi crossroads. The left lead is the Dete Road 17 km to Dete and the right is Kamativi Road to Kamativi Mine 29 km away. About 25 km on this road is the Binga Turn-off signposted. From this point Binga is about 155 km away.

Hwange

Hwange is 105 km from Halfway House, 335 km from Bulawayo and 105 km before Victoria Falls.
In this town are Hwange Colliery Mine and Hwange Thermal Power Station.

Kazungula Road
Victoria Falls is 105 km from Hwange and about 3 km from the border with Zambia where the A8 Highway ends. The P14 Highway to Kazungula runs west for 69 km to the Border Post with Botswana and Namibia. At Kazungula transit vehicles from Botswana and Namibia into Zambia are transported by a ferry across the Zambezi River.

Bridges
There are a number of high level bridges o the A8 Highway and these are a few major ones on the following Rivers.

(Direction is from Bulawayo to Victoria Falls)

• Umguza River
• Insuza River
• Bubi River
• Lupane River
• Shabula River
• Gwayi River
• Ilambo River
• Kapami River
• Inyantwe River
• Bongora River
• Lukozi River
• Deka River
• Matetsi River

Toll Plazas
The A8 is a road with tollgates at the following points.

See also
 A7 Highway
 Transport in Zimbabwe
 ZINARA

References

External links
 Zimbabwe Roads Map 
 Map 9.2 Road Transport Services and Infrastructure-African showing Road Numbers 

Roads in Zimbabwe